Mount Burns is a summit in Alberta, Canada.

Mount Burns was named after Pat Burns, the proprietor of a nearby mine.

References

Burns
Alberta's Rockies